L. Kaye Kory (born April 18, 1947) is an American politician. Since 2010 she has served in the Virginia House of Delegates, representing the 38th district in Fairfax County. She served on the Fairfax County School Board 1999–2009. Kory is a member of the Democratic Party.

, Kory serves as the Chair of the Counties, Cities Towns Committee and as a member of the Labor and Commerce Committee, Finance Committee, and Public Safety Committee.

Early life
Kory was born in Chicago. She attended The American School in Japan, and received a B.A. degree from Oxford College, now part of Miami University in 1969. She has also attended the University of Iowa and George Mason University.

Kory married Ross C. Kory, Jr. They have three children.

Community activism

Kory became involved with the parent-teacher associations (or, PTA) at her children's schools, and was elected president and treasurer of the Justice High School PTA (formerly J.E.B. Stuart High School).

Electoral history

In June 1999, Kory won a special election for the Fairfax County School Board. Kory won her next three subsequent elections.

In June 2009, Kory upset nine-term Virginia House of Delegates incumbent Robert D. Hull in a Democratic primary. She went on to win the seat in the general election that November.

In the 2019 election, Kory defeated primary challenger Andres Jimenez. In the general election, she was elected unopposed.

References

External links 
 (campaign finance)

1947 births
Living people
Democratic Party members of the Virginia House of Delegates
Women state legislators in Virginia
Miami University alumni
University of Iowa alumni
George Mason University alumni
School board members in Virginia
Politicians from Chicago
People from Fairfax County, Virginia
21st-century American politicians
21st-century American women politicians